Enneapterygius niger, known commonly as the black triplefin, is a species of triplefin blenny from the Western Pacific Ocean. It is a small species (up to  total length) that was described by Ronald Fricke in 1994.

References

niger
Fish described in 1994
Fish of the Pacific Ocean